Shin Jae-young (born November 18, 1989) is a South Korean professional baseball pitcher for the Kiwoom Heroes of the KBO League.

2016 
He even won the KBO Rookie of the Year with an ERA of 15 wins, seven losses and 3.90 wins in the 2016 season. Thanks to these achievements, the company signed an annual salary contract for next season for 110 million won, a whopping 307 percent increase.

References

External links
Career statistics and player information from Korea Baseball Organization

Shin Jae-young at Nexen Heroes Baseball Club 

Kiwoom Heroes players
KBO League pitchers
South Korean baseball players
KBO League Rookie of the Year Award winners
Dankook University alumni
Sportspeople from Daejeon
1989 births
Living people